Wenceslau Braz  may refer to:

People
Venceslau Brás, Wenceslau Braz Pereira Gomes, president of Brazil

Cities
Wenceslau Braz, Minas Gerais
Wenceslau Braz, Paraná